Tenellia diversicolor is a species of sea slug, an aeolid nudibranch, a marine gastropod mollusc in the family Fionidae.

Distribution
This species was described from the shore of Akasumi, west coast of the Noto Peninsula, Japan. The original description contains records from the Japan Sea coast of Middle Japan: Sado Island, Toyama Bay and Oki Island, Shimane Prefecture. Also reported from South Korea and Hong Kong.

Ecology
Tenellia diversicolor feeds on a hydroid, a species of Aglaophenia, family Aglaopheniidae.

References 

Fionidae
Gastropods described in 1975